Agios Georgios (named for Saint George) is a community in the municipality of Pyrgos, Elis, Greece. It is situated at the foot of low hills, 3 km north of the centre of Pyrgos. It is 2 km northeast of Lasteika and 2 km southeast of Prasino, in the municipal unit Iardanos. Settlement in the village started between 1900 and 1920. It has a soccer (football) club named Nikiforos.

See also
List of settlements in Elis

References

External links
Α.Ο. Νικηφόρος Αγίου Γεωργίου (Archived 2009-10-24)

Pyrgos, Elis
Populated places in Elis